North Carolina's 78th House district is one of 120 districts in the North Carolina House of Representatives. It has been represented by Republican Neal Jackson since 2023.

Geography
Since 2013, the district has included parts of Randolph and Moore counties. The district overlaps with the 21st, 25th, and 29th Senate districts.

District officeholders

Election results

2022

2020

2018

2016

2014

2012

2010

2008

2006

2004

2002

2000

References

North Carolina House districts
Randolph County, North Carolina
Moore County, North Carolina